The National Defense Research Committee (NDRC) was an organization created "to coordinate, supervise, and conduct scientific research on the problems underlying the development, production, and use of mechanisms and devices of warfare" in the United States from June 27, 1940, until June 28, 1941. Most of its work was done with the strictest secrecy, and it began research of what would become some of the most important technology during World War II, including radar and the atomic bomb. It was superseded by the Office of Scientific Research and Development in 1941, and reduced to merely an advisory organization until it was eventually terminated during 1947.

Organization
The NDRC was created by an order of President Franklin Delano Roosevelt on June 27, 1940. It was part of the Council of National Defense, which had been created during 1916 to coordinate industry and resources for national security purposes. Vannevar Bush, the director of the Carnegie Institution, had pressed for the creation of the NDRC because he had experienced during World War I the lack of cooperation between civilian scientists and the military. Bush managed to get a meeting with the President on June 12, 1940, and took a single sheet of paper describing the proposed agency. Roosevelt approved it in ten minutes. Government officials then complained that Bush was attempting to increase his authority and to bypass them—which he later admitted he was:

There were those who protested that the action of setting up NDRC was an end run, a grab by which a small company of scientists and engineers, acting outside established channels, got hold of the authority and money for the program of developing new weapons. That, in fact, is exactly what it was. (Bush 1970, p. 31–32)

In his June 15 letter which appointed Bush to the head of the committee, Roosevelt outlined that the NDRC was not meant to replace the research work done by the Army and Navy in their own laboratories or through industry contracts, but rather to "supplement this activity by extending the research base and enlisting the aid of the scientists who can effectively contribute to the more rapid improvement of important devices, and by study determine where new effort on new instrumentalities may be usefully employed." (Quoted in Stewart 1948, p. 8).

The NDRC was managed by eight members, one of which was the chairman and two of which were appointed automatically by virtue of their positions as President of the National Academy of Sciences and the Commissioner of Patents. One member was appointed by the Secretary of War and another by the Secretary of the Navy; the other four members were appointed without reference to other offices. The original eight members of the NDRC were: Vannevar Bush, President of the Carnegie Institution (Chairman); Rear Admiral Harold G. Bowen, Sr.; Conway P. Coe, Commissioner of Patents; Karl Compton, President of MIT; James B. Conant, President of Harvard University; Frank B. Jewett, President of the National Academy of Sciences and President of Bell Telephone Laboratories; Brigadier General George V. Strong; and Richard C. Tolman, Professor of Physical Chemistry and Mathematical Physics at California Institute of Technology. Strong was succeeded by Brigadier General R.C. Moore on January 17, 1941. During its first meeting on July 2, the NDRC elected Tolman as its Vice-Chairman and appointed Irvin Stewart as its Secretary. 
The NDRC members met approximately once a month until September 1942, after which it met either weekly or bi-weekly until the end of the war with Germany, after which it met irregularly.

NDRC research
Under the chairmanship of Bush the NDRC created new laboratories, including the Radiation Laboratory at the Massachusetts Institute of Technology, which aided the development of radar, and the Underwater Sound Laboratory at New London, Connecticut, which developed sonar. The former grew to be the largest single activity of the NDRC. In the year of its autonomous existence, the NDRC received approximately $6,500,000 (out of a requested $10,000,000) for research.

The NDRC's most important project eventually became the Manhattan Project—the full-scale project to produce nuclear weapons by the United States. An Advisory Committee on Uranium had been established to consider the feasibility of an atomic bomb as part of the National Bureau of Standards during 1939 as the result of the Einstein–Szilárd letter, but had not made significant progress. It was instructed in Roosevelt's June 15 letter to report to the NDRC and Bush, establishing the chain of command which would later result in the full-scale bomb project. During June 1940 Bush reorganized the Uranium Committee into a scientific body and eliminated military membership. No longer beholden to the military for funds, the NDRC had greater access to money for nuclear research. However, there was little impetus until the British MAUD Committee's findings were presented in 1941.

Creation of the OSRD
The increasing hostilities in Europe cause a desire to create a new organization which would supersede the NDRC and remedy some of the problems the NDRC was facing, in particular in converting scientific research into usable military technology ("development"), increased liaison between the different parts of military and civilian research in different government agencies, and creating a system for funding military medicine. At Bush's insistence Roosevelt issued Executive Order No. 8807 on June 28, 1941, which established the Office of Scientific Research and Development. The NDRC technically still existed after the creation of the OSRD but its authority had been reduced from being able to actually fund research to becoming simply an advisory body to the OSRD. The NDRC ceased to exist officially after its last meeting on January 20, 1947.

When it became the NDRC of the OSRD, the committee membership and structure was re-organized. The NDRC of the OSRD membership consisted of Conant (Chairman), Tolman (Vice-Chairman), Adams, Compton, and Jewett, along with the Commission of Patents (Coe until September 1945, and then Casper W. Ooms), and the representatives of the Army and Navy (which changed periodically). The Committee on Uranium was reorganized as the S-1 Section and it stopped being part of NDRC jurisdiction during December 1941.

Select NDRC projects
The NDRC funded research into hundreds of different projects at many different educational and industrial sites around the country. Some of the ones it is best remembered for include:
Atomic bomb research (would later become the Manhattan Project)
DUKW – amphibious vehicle
Project Pigeon
Proximity fuze
Radar at the Radiation Laboratory at the Massachusetts Institute of Technology

NDRC research organization
The NDRC's research organization changed constantly during its single year of autonomous existence. During early June 1941, shortly before it was superseded by the OSRD, its organization was as follows:
Division A (Armor and Ordnance) – Richard C. Tolman, Chairman; Charles C. Lauritsen, Vice-Chairman.
Section B (Structural Defense)
Section H (Investigations on Propulsion)
Section S (Terminal Ballistics)
Section T (Proximity Fuzes for Shells)
Section E (Fuzes and Guided Projectiles)
Division B (Bombs, Fuels, Gases, Chemical Problems) – James B. Conant, Chairman
Synthetic Problems – Roger Adams, Vice-Chairman
Section A-1 (Explosives)
Section A-2 (Synthetic Organics)
Section A-3 (Detection of Persistent Agents)
Section A-4 (Toxicity)
Physical Chemical Problems – W.K. Lewis, Vice-Chairman
Section L-1 (Aerosols)
Section L-2 (Protective Coatings)
Section L-3 (Special Inorganic Problems)
Section L-4 (Nitrocellulose)
Section L-5 (Paint Removers)
Section L-6 (Higher Oxides)
Section L-7 (Oxygen Storage)
Section L-8 (Gas Drying)
Section L-9 (Metallurgical Problems)
Section L-10 (Exhaust Disposal)
Section L-11 (Absorbents)
Section L-12 (Oxygen for Airplanes)
Section L-13 (Hydraulic Fluids)
Miscellaneous Chemical Problems
Section C-1 (Automotive Fuels; Special Problems)
Section C-2 (Pyrotechnics)
Section C-3 (Special Problems)
Division C (Communication and Transportation) – Frank B. Jewett, Chairman; C. B. Jolliffe, Hartley Rowe, R. D. Booth, and J. T. Tate, Vice-Chairmen.
Section C-1 (Communications)
Section C-2 (Transportation)
Section C-3 (Mechanical and Electrical Equipment)
Section C-4 (Submarine Studies)
Section C-5 (Sound Sources)
Division D (Detection, Controls, Instruments) – Karl Compton, Chairman; Alfred L. Loomis, Vice-Chairman.
Section D-1 (Detection)
Section D-2 (Controls)
Section D-3 (Instruments)
Section D-4 (Heat Radiation)
Division E (Patents and Invention) – Conway P. Coe, Chairman.

The Committee on Uranium, chaired by Lyman Briggs, reported directly to the Chairman of the NDRC and as such does not appear in the chart above.

Following the reorganization of the NDRC in December 1942, it had the following divisions:
Division 1 (Ballistics Research), L. H. Adams, Chief
Division 2 (Structural Defense and Offense/Effects of Impact and Explosion), John E. Burchard, Chief (1942–1944), E. Bright Wilson, Chief (1944–1946)
Division 3 (Special Projectiles/Rocket Ordnance), John T. Tate, Chief (1942–1943), Frederick L. Hovde, Chief (1943–1946)
Division 4 (Ordnance Accessories), Alexnder Ellett, Chief
Division 5 (New Missiles), H. B. Richmond, Chief (1942–1945), Hugh H. Spencer, Chief (1945–1946)
Division 6 (Subsurface Warfare), John T. Tate, Chief
Division 7 (Fire Control), Harold L. Hazen, Chief
Division 8 (Explosives), George B. Kistiakowsky, Chief (1942–1944), Ralph A. Connor, Chief (1944–1946)
Division 9 (Chemistry), Walter R. Kirner, Chief
Division 10 (Absorbents and Aerosols), W. A. Noyes, Jr., Chief
Division 11 (Chemical Engineering), R. P. Russell, Chief (1942–1943), E. P. Stevenson, Chief (1943–1945), H. M. Chadwell, Chief (1945–1946)
Division 12 (Transportation Development), Hartley Rowe, Chief
Division 13 (Electrical Communication), C. B. Jolliffe, Chief (1942–1944), Haraden Pratt, Chief (1944–1945)
Division 14 (Radar), Alfred L. Loomis, Chief
Division 15 (Radio Co-ordination), C. G. Suits, Chief
Division 16 (Optics), George R. Harrison, Chief
Division 17 (Physics), Paul E. Klopsteg, Chief (1942–1945), George R. Harrison, Chief (1945–1946)
Division 18 (War Metallurgy), Clyde Williams, Chief
Division 19 (Miscellaneous Weapons), H. M. Chadwell, Chief
Applied Mathematics Panel, Warren Weaver, Chief
Applied Psychology Panel, W. S. Hunter, Chief (1943–1945), Charles W. Bray, Chief (1945–1946)

References
Bush, Vannevar. Pieces of the Action. New York: Morrow, 1970.
Stewart, Irvin. Organizing Scientific Research for War: The Administrative History of the Office of Scientific Research and Development. Boston: Little, Brown and Company, 1948. Especially Chapter 2, "National Defense Research Committee," pp. 7–34, and Chapter 4, "NDRC of OSRD — The Committee", pp. 52–78.

External links
"Order Establishing the National Defense Research Committee"
"Report of the National Defense Research Committee for the First Year of Operation"
Photograph of members of the NDRC (of the OSRD) in 1947 
http://coldwar-ct.com/Navy_Undersea_War_Lab.php

Nuclear history of the United States
Government agencies established in 1940
1941 disestablishments in the United States
Agencies of the United States government during World War II